Ernest-Omer Gingras (18 February 1887 – 11 September 1983) was a Liberal party member of the House of Commons of Canada. He was born in Saint-Camille, Quebec and became a clerk and merchant by career. He was born in 1887, the son of François Gingras.

He served as mayor of Marbleton, Quebec for 20 years. Gingras entered federal politics when he won the Richmond—Wolfe riding in the 1949 general election. He was re-elected for successive terms in 1953 and 1957 then defeated in 1958 by Florent Dubois of the Progressive Conservative party.

References

External links
 

1887 births
1983 deaths
Canadian merchants
Liberal Party of Canada MPs
Mayors of places in Quebec
Members of the House of Commons of Canada from Quebec
People from Estrie